Sexsational or Sexsacional may refer to:
 Sexsacional..! (Lalo Rodríguez album), released in 1989
 Sexsational (Tony Thompson album), released in 1995
 Sexsational (Tom Malar album), released in 2005